Pterodecta is a genus of moths of the family Callidulidae.

Species
Pterodecta felderi (Bremer, 1864)

References

Callidulidae